Thomas Scofield Handforth (September 16, 1897 – October 19, 1948) was an American artist and etcher. He wrote and illustrated the children's picture book Mei Li based on personal experience in China and won the 1939 Caldecott Medal for illustration.

Mei Li is about a girl who escapes her traditional life in the Chinese countryside to visit a Chinese New Year fair. It has been reissued since 1938 and Handforth's magnificent drawings of China in the 1930s are still animated and compelling. In 1939, he was considered an expert on Oriental art. Books he illustrated included in Sidonie, Totou in Bondage and Tranquilinas Paradise.

He was born in Tacoma, Washington, and studied art at the University of Washington. During World War I, he served in France with the anatomical unit in the Army's Sanitary Corps. He later studied art at L'Ecole des Beaux Arts in France. He lived in various locations, such as Paris, India, North Africa, Mexico, and China.

References

External links
 
Art by Thomas Handforth at the Smithsonian American Art Museum
"Thomas Handforth, China, and the real Mei Li"
Art by Thomas Handforth in the Seattle Public Library's Northwest Art Collection

1897 births
1948 deaths
Artists from Washington (state)
American printmakers
American etchers
Caldecott Medal winners
American children's book illustrators
Writers from Tacoma, Washington
Artists from Tacoma, Washington
American people of World War I